AFFW may stand for:
Australia's First Families of Wine
Argument from free will